Postřižinské is a brand of beer produced by the brewery in Nymburk in the Czech Republic.

Nymburk Brewery, founded in 1895, is with its annual production about 200 000 hectoliters among the medium-sized breweries. The name Postřižinské comes from Bohumil Hrabal's book Postřižiny (English as Cutting It Short), later made into a well-known film Cutting It Short (1980) by Jiří Menzel. Bohumil Hrabal spent his childhood in Nymburk as a stepson of the brewery's manager.

Brands
Postřižinské Výčepní – a pale draught beer, with 3.5 % ABV.
Postřižinské Pepinova desítka – a 10° pale draught beer, with 4.1% ABV.
Postřižinské Tmavé – a 11° tmavé výčepní (dark beer) with 4.3% ABV.
Postřižinské Jedenáctka – a 11° pale lager, with 4.7% ABV.
Postřižinské Francinův ležák – a 12° pale lager, with 5.1% ABV.
Postřižinské Něžný barbar – a 13° semi-dark lager, with 5.3% ABV.
Postřižinské Bogan – a 13.5° pale lager, with 5.5% ABV.
Postřižinské Sváteční speciál – a 14° special pale lager, with 5.8% ABV.
Postřižinské Střízlík – non-alcoholic beer.

Export beers:
Gold Bohemia Beer – a pale beer, with 2.8%, 3.5%, 4.1% and 5.1% ABV, bottled or cans.
Gold Bohemia Beer Dark – a dark beer, with 4.3% ABV, bottled or cans.
Nymburk Lager Beer – a pale beer with 3.5% ABV, in cans.
Postřižinské Ležák – Yeastless lager beer at 5.2% ABV in brown glass bottles.

References

External links
Official website

Beer in the Czech Republic